Radek Onderka (born 20 September 1973) is a retired Czech football forward. He made over 100 appearances in the Gambrinus liga. He also played in the 2. Bundesliga in Germany for two seasons.

Onderka played international football at under-21 level for Czech Republic U21.

Career

Onderka started his career with FC Baník Ostrava.

References

External links

1973 births
Living people
Czech footballers
Czech Republic under-21 international footballers
Czech First League players
FC Baník Ostrava players
SK Sigma Olomouc players
2. Bundesliga players
KFC Uerdingen 05 players
SFC Opava players
Czech expatriate footballers
Expatriate footballers in Germany
Association football forwards
Rot Weiss Ahlen players
Sportspeople from Opava